The chain-ladder or development  method is a prominent actuarial loss reserving technique. 
The chain-ladder method is used in both the property and casualty and health insurance fields. Its intent is to estimate incurred but not reported claims and project ultimate loss amounts.
The primary underlying assumption of the chain-ladder method is that historical loss development patterns are indicative of future loss development patterns.

Methodology

According to Jacqueline Friedland's "Estimating Unpaid Claims Using Basic Techniques," there are seven steps to apply the chain-ladder technique:

 Compile claims data in a development triangle
 Calculate age-to-age factors
 Calculate averages of the age-to-age factors
 Select claim development factors
 Select tail factor
 Calculate cumulative claim development factors
 Project ultimate claims

Age-to-age factors, also called loss development factors (LDFs) or link ratios, represent the ratio of loss amounts from one valuation date to another, and they are intended to capture growth patterns of losses over time. These factors are used to project where the ultimate amount losses will settle.

Example

First, losses (either reported or paid) are compiled into a triangle, where the rows represent accident years and the columns represent valuation dates. For example, the entry '43,169,009' represents loss amounts related to claims occurring in 1998, valued as of 24 months.

Next, age-to-age factors are determined by calculating the ratio of losses at subsequent valuation dates. From 24 months to 36 months, accident year 1998 losses increased from 43,169,009 to 45,568,919, so the corresponding age-to-age factor is 45,568,919 / 43,169,009 = 1.056. A "tail factor" is selected (in this case, 1.000) to project from the latest valuation age to ultimate.

Finally, averages of the age-to-age factors are calculated. Judgmental selections are made after observing several averages. The age-to-age factors are then multiplied together to obtain cumulative development factors.

The cumulative development factors multiplied by the reported (or paid) losses to project ultimate losses.

Incurred but not reported can be obtained by subtracting reported losses from ultimate losses, in this case, 569,172,456 - 543,481,587 = 25,690,869.

Limitations

The chain-ladder technique is only accurate when patterns of loss development in the past can be assumed to continue in the future. In contrast to other loss reserving methods such as the Bornhuetter–Ferguson method, it relies only on past experience to arrive at an incurred but not reported claims estimate.

When there are changes to an insurer's operations, such as a change in claims settlement times, changes in claims staffing, or changes to case reserve practices, the chain-ladder method will not produce an accurate estimate without adjustments.

The chain-ladder method is also very responsive to changes in experience, and as a result, it may be unsuitable for very volatile lines of business.

See also
Incurred but not reported
Loss reserving
Bornhuetter–Ferguson method

References

Actuarial science